Llanbedrgoch railway station was situated on the Red Wharf Bay branch line between Holland Arms railway station and Benllech, the penultimate station on the line off the main Anglesey Central Railway in Wales. Opening in 1909, it was a very simple station with only one short platform on the Up (east) side and a wooden waiting hut. It was an unstaffed request stop with no goods yard or sidings.

The station closed in 1930, as did the line itself to passenger trains, and the station building removed. The tracks themselves were taken up in 1953 and the location of the platform is now a caravan site.

References

Disused railway stations in Anglesey
Railway stations in Great Britain opened in 1909
Railway stations in Great Britain closed in 1930
Llanfair-Mathafarn-Eithaf
Former London and North Western Railway stations
1909 establishments in Wales
1930 disestablishments in Wales